The Rivière Blanche is a tributary of the Portneuf River, flowing in the municipalities of Sainte-Catherine-de-la-Jacques-Cartier, Pont-Rouge and Saint-Basile, in the regional county municipality (MRC) of Portneuf Regional County Municipality, in the administrative region of Capitale-Nationale, in the province of Quebec, in Canada.

Apart from the passage of the river in a small hamlet of Pont-Rouge (near Lake André), the Blanche river flows especially at the border between the agricultural and forest environment, the main economic activities of this small valley.

This valley is served by chemin du Rang Sainte-Madeleine, chemin du 2e rang du Brûlé, rue Lamothe, chemin Tâché and chemin des Ormeaux.

The surface of the Blanche River (except the rapids areas) is generally frozen from the beginning of December to the end of March; however, safe circulation on the ice is generally from late December to early March. The water level of the river varies with the seasons and the precipitation; the spring flood occurs in March or April.

Geography 
The Blanche River rises at Lac Blanc located in the northwestern part of the municipality of Sainte-Catherine-de-la-Jacques-Cartier.

  to the south-east in the forest zone and down the mountain, then south, to the outlet (coming from the north-east) of Lac Linteau, corresponding to the hamlet of Lac André ;
  towards the southwest by following the foot of the mountain, then crosses a small plain, to its mouth. Note: Part of this last segment marks the boundary between Pont-Rouge and Saint-Basile.

The Blanche river flows on the northeast bank of the Portneuf River.

From the mouth of the Blanche River, the current descends on  the Portneuf River, winding south-west through the St. Lawrence plain, to the north shore of the St. Lawrence River.

Toponymy 
The toponym "Rivière Blanche" was formalized on December 5, 1968, at the Place Names Bank of the Commission de toponymie du Québec.

See also 
 Portneuf Regional County Municipality
 Sainte-Catherine-de-la-Jacques-Cartier, a municipality
 Saint-Basile, a municipality
 Pont-Rouge, a municipality
 Portneuf River, a watercourse
 List of rivers of Quebec

References 

Rivers of Capitale-Nationale